Labotas or Leobotes (Greek: Λαβώτας or Λεωβώτης) was the son of Echestratus and was the fourth king of Sparta from the Agiad dynasty.

Labotas led a war against the Argives because the Kynouria occupied and supposedly lived in the surrounding areas that the Perioeci had inhabited.

According to Jerome and the Excerpta Latina Barbari he reigned 37 years. After his death, his son Doryssos inherited the throne.

9th-century BC Greek people
9th-century BC rulers
Agiad kings of Sparta